The Great War is a CBC television film documenting Canadian participation in the First World War. The film stars writer-director and award-winning documentarian Brian McKenna, Michael Rudder, and future Canadian Prime Minister Justin Trudeau — who became the official Liberal candidate for the Papineau, Quebec in April 2007 — portraying his fifth cousin, twice removed, Major Talbot Papineau. The film aired in two parts on Canadian television during the 90th Anniversary of the Vimy Ridge battle, on April 8 and 9, 2007.

The Fox website included the following notice seeking people to participate in the making of the film:

Did your great-grandfather take Vimy Ridge? Did he play a part in the three-month battle at Passchendaele? Did he break through the German line at Amiens? For a landmark film to mark the 90th anniversary of the First World War, the CBC is recruiting 300 descendants of those who went to war between 1914 and 1918. The descendants will walk in the footsteps of their ancestors and take part in massive battle recreations.

References

External links
Official site
 

CBC Television original films
Documentary films about World War I
2007 films
Canadian documentary television films
2000s Canadian films